Otto Wilhelm Aulie (27 September 1894 – 9 February 1923) was a Norwegian football defender.

Aulie was born in Tønsberg.  He was a right-back for Odd and Lyn, and was a Norwegian Football Cup winner with Odd in 1913 and 1915.

Aulie won a total of 28 caps for Norway, and played in all three of Norway's game at the Antwerp Olympics in 1920. He died of meningitis in Skien in 1923, aged just 28.

References

1894 births
1923 deaths
Norwegian footballers
Norway international footballers
Footballers at the 1920 Summer Olympics
Olympic footballers of Norway
Odds BK players
Lyn Fotball players
Sportspeople from Tønsberg
Neurological disease deaths in Norway
Deaths from meningitis
Association football defenders